Songwriter is the second studio album of the Filipino trio Apo Hiking Society released in 1976 under JEM Records.

Track listing
SIDE A: 
 Love Is for Singing
 Tell Me Why
 Mahirap Magmahal ng Syota ng Iba
 A Song for You
 We're Together
 Bluebirds

SIDE B: 
 Evening Show
 Show Me a Smile
 Restless People
 I Keep Remembering
 Those Were the Good Ole' Days*

Related links
The Official Apo Hiking Society Website 

APO Hiking Society albums
1976 albums